The 2010 KHL Junior Draft was the second entry draft held by the Kontinental Hockey League (KHL), taking place on June 4, 2010. Ice hockey players from around the world aged between 17 and 21 years of age were selected. Players eligible to take part in the draft were required to not have an active contract with a KHL, MHL or VHL team. A total of 690 players participated in the draft, 490 of these playing in Russia, 100 in Europe and 100 in North America.

The first pick of the first round was Dmitrij Jaškin playing for VHK Vsetín at the time of the draft. He was picked by Sibir Novosibirsk.

Nullified picks
Three draft picks were nullified by the league:
 CSKA's pick of Mikael Backlund
 Sibir's pick of Philip Larsen
 Lokomotiv's pick of John Tavares

The reasoning for the nullification was that these three players had active contracts with NHL teams at the time of the draft.

See also
2010–11 KHL season
2010 NHL Entry Draft
KHL territorial pick

References

External links
 A list of 490 players participating in the draft playing in Russia
 A list of 100 players participating in the draft playing in Europe
 A list of 100 players participating in the draft playing in North America
 All 2010 KHL Junior Draft picks

Kontinental Hockey League Junior Draft
Junior Draft